Chitinsky (masculine), Chitinskaya (feminine), or Chitinskoye (neuter) may refer to:
Chitinsky District, a district of Zabaykalsky Krai, Russia
Chita Oblast (Chitinskaya oblast), a former federal subject of Russia

See also
Chita (disambiguation)